Global AIDS and Tuberculosis Relief Act of 2000 or Global AIDS Research and Relief Act of 2000 is a United States federal law establishing the World Bank AIDS Trust Fund for the care and prevention of HIV/AIDS and tuberculosis in overseas continents supporting substantial populations. The Act of Congress endorsed the International Bank for Reconstruction and Development and International Development Association to govern the financial fund for the global opportunistic infection epidemics.

The H.R. 3519 legislation was passed by the 106th United States Congressional session and confirmed as a federal law by the 42nd President of the United States Bill Clinton on August 19, 2000.

Titles of the Act
Title 22 Chapter 76 codified law and Chapter 32 section amendments were drafted as three titled sections providing authorities for international assistance confronting the transmissible diseases HIV/AIDS and tuberculosis.

Title I - Assistance To Countries With Large Populations Having HIV/AIDS
22 U.S.C. § 6801 ~ Definitions
22 U.S.C. § 6802 ~ U.S. Congressional findings and purposes

Subchapter I - United States Assistance
22 U.S.C. § 6811 ~ Coordinated donor strategy for support and education of AIDS orphans in Sub-Saharan Africa
22 U.S.C. § 6812 ~ African crisis response initiative and HIV/AIDS training

Subchapter II - World Bank AIDS Trust Fund
Part A - Establishment of the Fund
22 U.S.C. § 6821 ~ Establishment
22 U.S.C. § 6822 ~ Grant authorities
22 U.S.C. § 6823 ~ Administration
22 U.S.C. § 6824 ~ Advisory Board

Part B - Reports
22 U.S.C. § 6831 ~ Reports to Congress

Part C - United States Financial Participation
22 U.S.C. § 6841 ~ Authorization of appropriations
22 U.S.C. § 6842 ~ Certification requirement

Title II - International Tuberculosis Control
22 U.S.C. § 2151b ~ U.S. Congressional findings
22 U.S.C. § 2151b(c) ~ Assistance For Tuberculosis Prevention, Treatment, Control, and Elimination

Title III - Administrative Authorities
22 U.S.C. § 2367 ~ Termination Expenses
22 U.S.C. § 2395l ~ Effective Program Oversight

See also

Global Alliance for Vaccines and Immunizations
International AIDS Vaccine Initiative
Joint United Nations Programme on HIV/AIDS
President's Emergency Plan for AIDS Relief
The Global Fund to Fight AIDS, Tuberculosis and Malaria
United States Agency for International Development

References

External links
 
 
 
 
 

Acts of the 106th United States Congress
United States federal health legislation
Health policy in the United States